Radovan Kulík (born 3 August 1983) is a Slovak football midfielder who currently plays for FK Sitno Banská Štiavnica. His former club was FK LAFC Lučenec.

References

External links

1983 births
Living people
Association football midfielders
Slovak footballers
FK Dukla Banská Bystrica players
FK Dubnica players
Slovak Super Liga players
FK Železiarne Podbrezová players
MŠK Novohrad Lučenec players